Elie Honig is an American attorney and legal commentator. He is the senior legal analyst for CNN. Previously, Honig was an assistant United States Attorney.

Early life
Honig was born in Camden, New Jersey, and raised in Voorhees Township and Cherry Hill. He is Jewish; Honig had his bar mitzvah in 1990. Two of his grandparents survived the Nazi concentration camps during The Holocaust.

Honig graduated from Cherry Hill High School East in 1993. He earned his bachelor's degree from Rutgers University in 1997 and his Juris Doctor from Harvard Law School in 2000.

Career
After graduating, Honig took a job with Covington & Burling in Washington, D.C. From 2004 to 2012, Honig was an assistant United States attorney in the Southern District of New York. He prosecuted organized crime. In 2010, he became the deputy chief of the Organized Crime Unit. He achieved convictions on over 100 members of the American mafia, including members of the Genovese and Gambino crime families such as Ciro Perrone, Matthew Ianniello, Angelo Prisco, Daniel Marino, and Joseph Corozzo.

In September 2012, Honig joined the Attorney General of New Jersey's office as the deputy director of the Division of Criminal Justice. He was named director of the division in February 2013. He led the division's bail reform initiative in 2017.

Honig joined Lowenstein Sandler in June 2018. In September 2018, he became a senior legal analyst for CNN. Honig's first book, Hatchet Man: How Bill Barr Broke the Prosecutor's Code and Corrupted the Justice Department, was published in 2021. His second book, Untouchable: How Powerful People Get Away with It, ships in late-January 2023. He has also produced a podcast, "Up Against the Mob", and a documentary for CNN on the trial of Adolf Eichmann, in which he interviewed the trial's prosecutor, Gabriel Bach.

Personal life
Honig's wife, Rachael, is also an attorney; she was an assistant United States attorney for New Jersey. They have two children and live in Metuchen, New Jersey.

Bibliography

References

Living people
Cherry Hill High School East alumni
People from Camden, New Jersey
People from Cherry Hill, New Jersey
People from Metuchen, New Jersey
People from Voorhees Township, New Jersey
New Jersey lawyers
Rutgers University alumni
Harvard Law School alumni
Assistant United States Attorneys
CNN people
Year of birth missing (living people)